Alfred Montmarquette (6 April 1871 - 24 May 1944) was a Canadian folksong composer and accordionist.

Biography
Montmarquette was born in New York on 6 April 1871, and taught himself the accordion from the age of twelve, and had mastered it while still an adolescent. Unable to earn a living as a professional musician, he worked as a mason. He moved to Montreal in the 1920s, and was over fifty years old when Conrad Gauthier's Veillées du bon vieux temps made him well known.

Between 1928 and 1932, he recorded more than 110 pieces for Starr Records, and also recorded with Ovila Légaré, Eugène Daigneault and Mary Bolduc.

He died in an insane asylum in Montréal on 24 May 1944.

Songs
 Rose Alma Polka
 Marche des collégiens
 Galop des pompiers

References

Discography

1871 births
1944 deaths
Canadian composers
Canadian male composers
Musicians from Montreal
Musicians from New York (state)
Canadian accordionists
Deaths in mental institutions